Jougla Point is a point forming the west side of the entrance to Alice Creek in Port Lockroy, lying on the west side of Wiencke Island, in the Palmer Archipelago, Antarctica. It was discovered and named by the French Antarctic Expedition, 1903–05, under Jean-Baptiste Charcot, who considered it to be a peninsula. Because of its small size the term point is considered more appropriate.

References

External links
Secretariat of the Antarctic Treaty Visitor Guidelines and peninsula description

Headlands of the Palmer Archipelago